NGC 1409 is a quiescent lenticular galaxy in the equatorial constellation of Taurus. It was discovered by the German-born astronomer William Herschel on January 6, 1785. NGC 1409 is located in close proximity to the smaller Seyfert galaxy NGC 1410, and the two are strongly interacting.

The morphological classification of this galaxy most closely matches type SB0, which indicates a barred lenticular galaxy. There is a conspicuous pipeline of dust and gas being funneled to NGC 1409 from NGC 1410. However, there is no indications of recent star formation in NGC 1409 from this incoming material.

References

External links
 
 NGC 1409 at Hubblesite.com

Lenticular galaxies
Interacting galaxies
Taurus (constellation)
1409
02821
13553